Timité Oussou Sekou (born 11 May 1985 in Bondoukou) is an Ivorian association footballer. He is a classic centre forward, but can also play as a second striker.

Career
Sekou began his career with Issia Wazi in 2004. On 28 July 2005, he left the club to join Espérance Sportive de Tunis. In January 2006, he joined Espérance's CLP-1 rivals Olympique Béja. In Summer 2008, he left Olympique Béja and moved to Challenge League club FC Winterthur in Switzerland. After 6 months, he left to sign a contract with Stade Tunisien.  Sekou returned to Ivory Coast in January 2012 to join Africa Sports. He was transferred to JS Saoura in Algeria in July 2012.

References

1985 births
Living people
Ivorian footballers
Ivorian expatriate footballers
Expatriate footballers in Switzerland
FC Winterthur players
Association football forwards
Ivorian expatriate sportspeople in Switzerland
Expatriate footballers in Tunisia
Expatriate footballers in Algeria
Issia Wazy players
Ivorian expatriate sportspeople in Tunisia
Ivorian expatriate sportspeople in Algeria
People from Bondoukou
Espérance Sportive de Tunis players
Olympique Béja players
Stade Tunisien players
JS Saoura players